Re Voltere is the Swedish punk group Dia Psalma's fifth studio album, the second after they reunited in 2006. The song "Kulisser" was shot as a video in 2008.

Track listing

Credits

Band
Ulke, Guitars and vocals
Pontus, Guitars and backing vocals
Ztikkan, Bass and backing vocals
Stipen, Percussion

Guests
Johan Andersson, Violin
Anna Brodin, Cello
Mikael Galloni, Speaking voice on "Kalle Iskall"

Chart positions

References

2009 albums
Dia Psalma albums